Lago Cochrane National Reserve, also known as Tamango National Reserve, is a nature reserve located  northeast of the town of Cochrane, in Aysén del General Carlos Ibáñez del Campo Region, Chile. It is named after Cochrane Lake, which, according to C. Michael Hogan, is a large lake of glacial origin. The reserve occupies the slope of Cerro Tamango and is bordered by Cochrane Lake and Cochrane River on the south side.
The endangered South Andean Deer is found in the reserve.

A new, 25,000 km2 national park called Patagonia National Park will combine Lago Cochrane National Reserve, Lago Jeinimeni National Reserve, and the privately owned Patagonia Park.

References

 CONAF: Reserva Nacional Lago Cochrane
World Wildlife Fund; C. Michael Hogan. 2010. "Magellanic subpolar forests". Encyclopedia of Earth, National Council for Science and the Environment. Washington DC

Protected areas of Aysén Region
National reserves of Chile
Protected areas established in 1967